Three Men in the Snow may refer to:
 Three Men in the Snow, a novel by Erich Kästner
 Three Men in the Snow (1936 film), a 1936 Czech comedy film
 Three Men in the Snow (1955 film), a 1955 German comedy film
 Three Men in the Snow (1974 film), a 1974 West German comedy film